Duey and Julia Wright House is a Frank Lloyd Wright designed Usonian home that was constructed on a bluff above the Wisconsin River in Wausau, Wisconsin in 1958. Viewed from the sky, the house resembles a musical note. The client owned a Wausau music store, and later founded the broadcasting company Midwest Communications through his ownership of WRIG radio. The home also has perforated boards on the clerestories "represent the rhythm of Beethoven's Fifth Symphony Allegro con brio first theme." A photograph showing the perforated panels is in the web page on the National Register application.

The use of materials in the home (concrete blocks), its single floor, suggests that the home is a Usonian design, however it is larger than most: 4,337 square feet (402.92 sq. meters). Yet, the arrangement of the floor plan uses Usonian principles: the kitchen is open to the living room and dining area, and the four bedrooms are accessible from a gallery, and there is a clerestory that uses perforated plywood panels designed specifically for the home. The living room has a builtin bench around the wall, to allow seating for 30 people during live concerts.

The home was designed by Wright, but completed after his death under the direction of John H. "Jack" Howe and John deKoven Hill, former apprentices of Wright and members of the Taliesin Fellowship. At that time, both Hill and Howe were architects in Taliesin Associated Architects, Wright's successor firm.

References 

 Storrer, William Allin. The Frank Lloyd Wright Companion. University Of Chicago Press, 2006,  (S.420)

External links

Text of application for State Register
Wright house on waymarking.com

Wausau, Wisconsin
Frank Lloyd Wright buildings
Houses on the National Register of Historic Places in Wisconsin
Houses in Marathon County, Wisconsin
National Register of Historic Places in Marathon County, Wisconsin